The 2015 Dubai Sevens was the first tournament within the 2015–16 World Rugby Sevens Series. It was held over the weekend of 4–5 December 2015 at The Sevens Stadium in Dubai, United Arab Emirates.

Format
The teams are drawn into four pools of four teams each. Each team plays every other team in their pool once. The top two teams from each pool advance to the Cup/Plate brackets. The bottom two teams from each group go to the Bowl/Shield brackets.

Teams
The 16 participating teams for the tournament:

Pool stage

Pool A

Pool B

Pool C

Pool D

Knockout stage

Shield

Bowl

Plate

Cup

Scoring

Source: WR website

Awards
 HSBC Player of the Final - Jerry Tuwai''

References

External links
World Rugby Sevens Series website
Dubai Rugby 7s website

2015
2015–16 World Rugby Sevens Series
2015 in Emirati sport
2015 in Asian rugby union